1840 in sports describes the year's events in world sport.

Boxing
Events
 22 September — James Burke meets Nicholas Ward at Lillingstone Level for the English Championship title, vacant again following the injury to William "Bendigo" Thompson.  In highly controversial circumstances, Ward's backers prevail upon the referee to disqualify Burke in the 17th round for an alleged foul.
 The third contender Ben Caunt enhances his title claim by defeating Bill Brassey in a fight lasting 101 rounds.  This victory sets up a bout with Ward the following year.

Cricket
Events
 William Lillywhite's tally of 83 wickets is the highest known season total to date
England
 Most runs – Charles Hawkins 274 @ 14.42 (HS 58)
 Most wickets – William Lillywhite 83 (BB 8–?)

Curling
 Establishment of the original Detroit Curling Club, substantially reorganised in 1885

Horse racing
England
 Grand National – Jerry
 1,000 Guineas Stakes – Crucifix
 2,000 Guineas Stakes – Crucifix
 The Derby – Little Wonder
 The Oaks – Crucifix
 St. Leger Stakes – Launcelot

Rowing
The Boat Race
 15 April — Cambridge wins the 4th Oxford and Cambridge Boat Race

References

 
Sports by year